The Palatka-Lake Butler State Trail (PLB) corridor stretches nearly  from the vicinity of Lake Butler, Florida to Palatka, Florida. The project is located along the former Georgia Southern and Florida Railway right-of-way and the trail is being constructed on top of the existing abandoned railroad bed through (from east to west) Putnam,  Clay, Bradford, and Union counties.

The corridor was purchased with Preservation 2000 funds through the Office of Greenways and Trails Acquisition Program. The Rails to Trails Conservancy played a key role in preserving the corridor for conversion to a rail-trail and the trail was designated as part of the Florida Greenways & Trails System in 2007.

Construction of a  multi-use recreational trail along this corridor is being completed in phases, and the first paved section of  opened in Clay County in 2008. The paved trail now runs from western Keystone Heights through and past Florahome through the southern edges of the Etoniah Creek State Forest.

The eastern end of the pavement is diagonally west of the Kay Larkin Airport in Palatka. The construction was administered by the Florida Department of Transportation (FDOT) and funded in part through the Transportation Equity Act of the 21st Century Act (TEA-21). The Trail is managed by the DEP Office of Greenways & Trails.

This bike path runs north from downtown Keystone Heights to Mike Roess Gold Head Branch State Park. Twin Lakes Park in Keystone Heights serves as the main trailhead for the Clay County segment and was developed by Clay County with funding from the Florida Recreation Development Assistance Program.

The remainder of the PLB Trail is still in the design phase. The final design must be completed before any additional paving can occur and the  recreational trail is fully constructed.

A section of the  Florida National Scenic Trail is being developed adjacent to the PLB Trail.

Gallery

References

External links

 Palatka-Lake Butler State Trail at Florida State Parks
 Palatka-Lake Butler State Trail at 100 Florida Trails
 Palatka-Lake Butler State Trail at Florida Hikes

Protected areas of Bradford County, Florida
Protected areas of Clay County, Florida
Hiking trails in Florida
Protected areas of Putnam County, Florida
Protected areas of Union County, Florida
Rail trails in Florida
Bike paths in Florida
2007 establishments in Florida